Herman III, Count of Weimar-Orlamünde ( – 1283) was a member of the Weimar-Orlamünde branch of the House of Ascania.

Life 
Herman III was a son of Herman II (d. 1247) and his wife, Beatrix of Andechs-Merania (d. 1265).  Hermann and his brother Otto III jointly inherited the Franconian possessions of their maternal uncle Otto II.  They resided at the Plassenburg.

In 1278, Hermann and Otto divided their inheritance.  Otto III took the County of Weimar and the Plassenburg; Hermann III took the County of Orlamünde.

Hermann III died of the plague in 1283.

Marriage and issue 
His wife, whose name is unknown, died after 21 July 1279.  They had four children:
 Elisabeth "the Elder" (d. before 24 March 1333), married:
 Hertmann I of Lobdeburg-Arnshaugk (d. 20 February 1289)
 Albert II, Margrave of Meissen (d. 20 November 1315)
 Herman V (before 1287 – after 1312)
 Henry III (d. after 26 March 1354), succeeded his father as Count of Orlamünde, married Irmgard of Schwarzburg (d. 13 July 1354)
 Elisabeth "the Younger" (d. 17 March 1319), a nun at the Weißenfels monastery

References 
 Hermann Grote: Stammtafeln, Leipzig, 1877, p. 221
 Detlev Schwennicke: Europäische Stammtafeln, New edition, vol. I.2, Vittorio Klostermann, Frankfurt, 1999, table 185

House of Ascania
Counts of Weimar-Orlamünde
1230 births
1283 deaths
Year of birth uncertain
13th-century German nobility